The 1855 California gubernatorial election was held on September 5, 1855, to elect the governor of California. Incumbent governor John Bigler lost his bid for reelection.

Results

References

1855
California
gubernatorial
September 1855 events